Steven Portnoy (born 1981) is a CBS News correspondent covering the White House for CBS News Radio. He served as president of the White House Correspondents’ Association from 2021-2022.  He reported from Capitol Hill before the election of President Trump. From 2006 to 2015, he was a Washington, DC-based correspondent for ABC News Radio, where he covered legal affairs and breaking stories in addition to regularly reporting on Congress and the White House.  While at ABC, he was also a regular host of Ahead of the Curve, a technology-based talk show on ABC News Now, the network's 24/7 digital TV platform.

Raised in South Brunswick, New Jersey, Portnoy graduated from South Brunswick High School in 1999 and received the school's Distinguished Alumni Award in 2012.

Portnoy reported for WSYR (AM) and produced at WSTM-TV and WIXT-TV (now WSYR-TV) while he was a student at the S.I. Newhouse School for Public Communications at Syracuse University.  In 2001, he took first place at the Hearst Journalism Awards for his reporting on the economic downturn in the early part of the decade.

Prior to joining ABC News in 2006, Portnoy reported for WMAL, a Washington radio station that was owned by ABC until 2007.

In 2008, Portnoy was named a Peter Jennings Fellow at the National Constitution Center in Philadelphia.  He has since won several local and regional awards and shared in national Edward R. Murrow awards for breaking news coverage in 2007 (Virginia Tech massacre), 2011 (anchoring the network's radio coverage of the death of Osama bin Laden), and 2013 (Boston Marathon bombing), and for continuing coverage (Hurricane Sandy) in 2012.

References

External links 
 CBS News Bio
 CBS News Radio
 ABC News Radio
 ABC News

Living people
ABC News personalities
American radio reporters and correspondents
American male journalists
Journalists from Washington, D.C.
People from South Brunswick, New Jersey
South Brunswick High School (New Jersey) alumni
Syracuse University alumni
1981 births